Kaupanger Idrettslag is a Norwegian sports club from Kaupanger in Sogndal. It has sections for association football, athletics, floorball and skiing.

The men's football team currently plays in the Third Division, the fourth tier of Norwegian football. The women's team plays in the First Division, which is the second tier. They played in the Premier League as late as in 1999, and they were represented at the 1991 FIFA Women's World Cup by Anette Igland. Kaupanger stadion is their home field, and the team colors are green and black.

Recent seasons

References

 Official site 

Football clubs in Norway
Sport in Sogn og Fjordane
Sogndal

Athletics clubs in Norway